Lee St Hilaire (born 15 February 1967) is an English former professional rugby league footballer who played in the 1980s and 1990s, and coached in the 2000s. St Hilaire joined the Bradford Bulls from Wakefield Trinity Wildcats in July 2006, to become assistant coach to Steve McNamara, he had previously coached the reserve team at Huddersfield Giants. He is the brother of Marcus St Hilaire. In July 2010 it was announced that Steve McNamara was to leave Bradford by mutual agreement and Lee is to take charge of the Bradford Bulls for the remainder of the 2010 Super League campaign. He is now assistant coach under Francis Cummins

References

External links
Bulls 'relaxed' ahead of Wigan trip - St Hilaire
Bradford Bulls hand new deals to three players
Bradford Bulls coach looking forward to Quins challenge

1967 births
Living people
Black British sportspeople
Bradford Bulls coaches
Castleford Tigers players
English people of Trinidad and Tobago descent
English rugby league coaches
English rugby league players
Huddersfield Giants players
Hunslet R.L.F.C. players
Rugby league hookers
Rugby league players from Huddersfield